Verkhnie Kotly is a train station of the Paveletsky suburban railway line. It was opened in 2018 to provide an interchange to Moscow Central Circle.

Since December 2018, the Aeroexpress trains to Moscow-Domodedovo from Moscow Paveletsky Railway Station stop at Verkhnie Kotly.

References

Railway stations in Moscow
Railway stations of Moscow Railway
Railway stations in Russia opened in 2018